Tinytrema is a genus of spiders in the family Trachycosmidae. It was first described in 2002 by Platnick. , it contains 5 Australian species.

References

Trochanteriidae
Araneomorphae genera
Spiders of Australia